NEDD8-activating enzyme E1 catalytic subunit is a protein that in humans is encoded by the UBA3 gene.

The modification of proteins with ubiquitin is an important cellular mechanism for targeting abnormal or short-lived proteins for degradation. Ubiquitination involves at least three classes of enzymes: ubiquitin-activating enzymes, or E1s, ubiquitin-conjugating enzymes, or E2s, and ubiquitin-protein ligases, or E3s. This gene encodes a member of the E1 ubiquitin-activating enzyme family. The encoded enzyme associates with AppBp1, an amyloid beta precursor protein binding protein, to form a heterodimer, and then the enzyme complex activates NEDD8, a ubiquitin-like protein, which regulates cell division, signaling and embryogenesis. Multiple alternatively spliced transcript variants encoding distinct isoforms have been found for this gene.

This enzyme contains an E2 binding domain, which resembles ubiquitin, and recruits the catalytic core of the E2 enzyme UBE2M (Ubc12) in a similar manner to that in which ubiquitin interacts with ubiquitin binding domains.

Interactions
UBE1C has been shown to interact with NEDD8, APPBP1 and UBE2M.

References

Further reading

External links 
 PDBe-KB provides an overview of all the structure information available in the PDB for Human NEDD8-activating enzyme E1 catalytic subunit (UBE1C)

Protein domains